The 1968 Ottawa Rough Riders finished in 1st place in the Eastern Conference with a 9–3–2 record and won the Grey Cup.

Preseason

Regular season

Standings

Schedule

Postseason

Playoffs

Grey Cup

Player stats

Passing

Awards and honours
CFL's Most Outstanding Lineman Award – Ken Lehmann (LB)
Grey Cup Most Valuable Player – Vic Washington (RB)
Russ Jackson, QB, Eastern Division All-Star

CFL All-Stars 
Russ Jackson, QB

References

Ottawa Rough Riders seasons
James S. Dixon Trophy championship seasons
Grey Cup championship seasons
1968 Canadian Football League season by team